North Star Mall is a shopping mall in San Antonio, Texas, USA with anchor tenants Dillard's, JCPenney, Macy's, Saks Fifth Avenue, and Forever 21. It also has over 200 specialty stores, some exclusive to the San Antonio market, including Armani Exchange, The Cheesecake Factory, Build-A-Bear Workshop, MAC Cosmetics, and Oakley.  It, which opened in 1960, is located at the intersection of Loop 410 and San Pedro Avenue in the city's Uptown District.  It is a well-known city landmark for its Texas-sized cowboy boots, created by Texas artist Bob "Daddy-O" Wade, that are located along its Loop 410 frontage.

History

On September 23, 1960, Community Research & Development Corporation (later to become The Rouse Company) opens the doors to North Star Mall, a new  fully enclosed shopping center located at the intersection of San Pedro Avenue and Loop 13 (now Interstate 410 Connally Loop).  The center opens with Wolff and Marx, H-E-B, Walgreens and 50 other shops and is the fifth shopping center developed by CRDC. A time capsule scheduled to be opened in 1985 is laid to commemorate the mall's opening.

The mall is expanded in 1963 and new anchor Frost Bros. was opened.
A two-screen movie theater was added to the mall was added in 1964.
The mall was expanded again in 1969 and Wolff and Marx relocated into a new four-level building as part of the expansion and is renamed Joske's. A two-level parking deck with a full service Texaco was added south of Joske's.

The Rouse Company sold a 62.5% stake in North Star Mall to Rodamco North America in 1974.

In 1980, a pair of -tall cowboy boots, a sculpture by the late artist Bob "Daddy-O" Wade entitled 'The Giant Justins,' were installed on the I-410 frontage road.  The mall promotes the sculpture, created for the Washington Project for the Arts in 1979, as the "world's largest pair of cowboy boots."  In 2020, the sculpture remain intact and celebrated its forty year mainstay at the mall.

A major renovation of the mall was completed in 1982, adding food and music courts as well as a new Foley's that is located on the former H-E-B and original Walgreens sites.

A new multi-level parking garage and two-story wing were added to the mall in 1985, along with new anchor Saks Fifth Avenue. North Star Mall celebrated its 25th anniversary, opens the 1960 time capsule, and dedicated a new one that was opened on September 23, 2010.

Two additional multi-level parking garages were opened in 1986 and another three-story wing is added to the mall that includes new anchor Marshall Field's and a new food court.
Joske's was bought in 1987 and renamed Dillard's.

Frost Bros. liquidated and closed in 1989. The Gucci boutique previously located in there relocated to a new two-level store adjacent to Saks Fifth Avenue.

In 1992, Mervyns opened in the former Frost Bros. location.
Marshall Field's pulled out of the Texas market in 1997 and the North Star Mall location is purchased by and converted into Macy's.  Saks Fifth Avenue completes a major renovation on its existing store and also opens a new men's store in space leased from the mall directly adjacent to the existing store.

The Rouse Company sold an additional stake in North Star Mall to Rodamco in 2000, leaving Rouse less than 5% ownership of the property.

The Rouse Company reassumed ownership of North Star Mall in 2002 by purchasing the property (and several others) from Rodamco North America.

The Rouse Company began a multi-year, multimillion-dollar renovation in 2004. The renovation is to be the most extensive renovation the mall has seen in its history.

General Growth Properties purchased The Rouse Company and became owner of the mall. The scheduled renovation of the mall was postponed as a result of the transaction.

In 2005, as a result of the Federated Department Stores/May Department Stores transaction, Macy's announced it would close its  three-level store at North Star in 2006 and rebrand the  Foley's store as Macy's.

In 2006, General Growth Properties purchased the Macy's location from Federated. Mall officials announced that JCPenney would open a store in the former Macy's/Marshall Field's location in summer 2007. A multimillion-dollar renovation planned since 1999 but stalled due to the 2004 ownership change finally resumes. Renovations will include the mall's interior and exterior, including the addition of ten-foot letters outside the mall spelling out "North Star." As part of the Federated/May merger, Macy's is closed and Foley's is renamed Macy's. The former Foley's location becomes Macy's San Antonio flagship store.

JCPenney opened in 2007 in the former Macy's location on August 2.
In 2008 California-based Mervyns announces on August 13 that it will close its three San Antonio stores (including the North Star Mall location) by November 2008.
The new Apple Store opened in 2008.

In 2010, North Star Mall celebrated its 50th anniversary and opened the 1985 time capsule. The same year, Forever 21 relocated its existing store into the former Mervyns location and a Michael Kors store opened by the start of the holiday shopping season.

On March 2, 2020, North Star Mall was closed for 24 hours for disinfection following a visit by a woman whom had re-tested positive for the COVID-19 Coronavirus after being released from the Texas Center for Infectious Disease (TCID).

Previous anchors
Previous anchors include Wolff and Marx, Frost Bros. (the space now occupied by Forever 21), Marshall Field's (the space most recently occupied by Macy's, then re-opened as JCPenney in summer 2007), and Foley's (the space now occupied by Macy's). Wolff and Marx closed in 1969 (and owner Joske's opened a new four-level Joske's store the same year), Frost Bros. was liquidated in 1989 after one year in bankruptcy, Marshall Field's exited the Texas market in 1997, and Foley's was renamed Macy's in 2006.

Additional information
There used to be an underground arcade, called the Music Court. Added in 1982 near the north entry between what is currently JCPenney and Saks Fifth Avenue, it was accessible only by escalator. In the early 1980s, the arcade's tenants included Expensive Toys for Big Boys, a record store, and a music store. An Oshman's Sporting Goods store leased the entire arcade space in the late 1980s and moved the escalator to the main corridor of pedestrian traffic for prime access. The Oshman's closed in the 1990s when it opened a superstore across the highway (then Sports Authority, but closed in 2016), and the underground space has since been closed off.

The parking garage added in the mid-1980s between Saks and Dillard's displaced the mall's movie theater complex. The Texaco fuel station located in the mall's original underground garage (at the corner of Rector and McCullough) was also closed during the 1980s renovations.

The North Star Transit Center, operated by VIA Metropolitan Transit, is located adjacent to the mall's northwest corner

References

External links

 North Star Mall official website
 Bob "Daddy-O" Wade official website

Shopping malls established in 1960
History of San Antonio
Brookfield Properties
Shopping malls in San Antonio